Avnyash (Äwnäş) is a rural locality (a village) in Yangilsky Selsoviet, Abzelilovsky District, Bashkortostan, Russia. The population was 399 as of 2010. There are 6 streets.

Geography 
Avnyash is located 35 km southeast of Askarovo (the district's administrative centre) by road. Gusevo is the nearest rural locality.

References 

Rural localities in Abzelilovsky District